Östra Karup is a locality situated in Båstad Municipality, Skåne County, Sweden with 594 inhabitants in 2010.

References 

Populated places in Båstad Municipality
Populated places in Skåne County